St. Timothy's Church, Roxborough is a parish of the Episcopal Diocese of Pennsylvania in the Roxborough neighborhood of Philadelphia, Pennsylvania. It is part of the Wissahickon Deanery of the Diocese of Pennsylvania. In 1962, St. Timothy's reported membership of 1,144 and weekly attendance of 849, while its 2020 reported attendance was 59 persons.

It was founded in 1859 by lay members of St. Mark's Church, Locust Street with a Tractarian High Church ethos including free pew sittings. The first services were conducted by a priest from St. David's Episcopal Church in Manayunk. Financial difficulties required the adoption of a pew-rental system in 1863. The parish had a historically Anglo-Catholic character, adopting an early weekly celebration of the Holy Communion in 1869, with the main Sunday service becoming Holy Communion in 1909. In 1893 the Anglo-Catholic Sisterhood of the Holy Nativity, affiliated with the Cowley Fathers (Society of St. John the Evangelist) began work in the parish and at the adjacent St. Timothy's Hospital.

The cornerstone for the church building was laid on July 18, 1862 by Bishop Alonzo Potter. The church was consecrated by Bishop William Bacon Stevens on February 14, 1863, as one of his early official episcopal acts. Its architect was Emlen T. Littell, who also built New York's Church of the Incarnation, Zion Episcopal Church, Palmyra, New York, St. Paul's Episcopal Church, Poughkeepsie and many other buildings with a parish Gothic style. A vandal attempted to blow up the church in 1899 using its municipal gas-light supply.

The studios of Victorian Anglo-Catholic stained glass artist Charles Eamer Kempe (1837-1907) designed the majority of the church's windows as memorials to members of the local Merrick and Cope families. The stations of the cross are the work of Thorsten Sigstedt (1884-1963), a Swedish American woodcarver with studios in Bryn Athyn, Pennsylvania. The first burials in the adjacent cemetery, which is active in 2022, began in 1863. A two-manual organ by Frank Roosevelt (Opus 367) was installed in 1887; in 2006 a 1967 Wicks/1997 Buzard organ with three manuals, 32 stops, 36 ranks from First Baptist Church in Decatur, Illinois was installed.

The parish's current rector is the Rev. Dr. Bonnie McCrickard, a seminary graduate of the University of the South (Sewanee) and Drew University (D.Min).

Rectors
 John Leighton McKim 1860-1862
 Samuel Hall 1863-1867
 William Augustus White 1867-1877
 Robert Evans Dennison 1878-1907
 James Biddle Halsey 1908-1919
 Sidney Atmore Caine 1919-1930
 George Herbert Dennison 1930-1934
 Edmund Bacon Wood 1934-1952
 John Robert Rockett 1952-1958
 Theron Adair Vallee 1958-1960
 Eugene Francis Lefebvre 1960-1992 (died 2018)
 Charles J. Blauvelt
 Kirk T. Berlenbach 2003-2017
 Bonnie McCrickard 2018—

See also 
St. David's Church, Manayunk
Church of St. Alban, Roxborough
St. Peter's Episcopal Church of Germantown
St. Alban's Church, Olney

References 
John C. Manton, A Splendid Legacy: St. Timothy's, Roxborough, 1859-1984 (Parish history, © 1984)
John C. Manton, Death Certificates for Some of the Interments in Saint Timothy's Churchyard, Roxborough, Philadelphia, Pennsylvania 1863-1915 (St. Timothy's Church, 2014), two volumes

External links 
Official parish website Instagram account
Cemetery from Find a Grave
Historical material on St. Timothy's Church from Philadelphia Studies
The Way of the Cross: Sculptures by Thorsten Sigstedt
Pipe Organ Database Roosevelt Opus 367
1967 Wicks / 1997 Buzard Organ
Episcopal Diocese of Pennsylvania

1859 establishments in Pennsylvania
Christian organizations established in the 1850s
Churches in Philadelphia
Episcopal Church in Pennsylvania
Religious organizations established in 1859
19th-century Episcopal church buildings